Saint-Domineuc is a commune in the Ille-et-Vilaine département in Brittany in northwestern France.

Population
Inhabitants of Saint-Domineuc are called docmaëliens in French.

See also
Communes of the Ille-et-Vilaine department

References

External links

Mayors of Ille-et-Vilaine Association 

Communes of Ille-et-Vilaine